Hellenic League may refer to:

Ancient history
The association of Greek city states against the Persians during the Greco-Persian Wars of the 5th century BCE
The League of Corinth, an association of Greek polities and city states, under the leadership of Philip II and Alexander the Great, 4th century BCE
The association of Greeks under Antigonus and Demetrius I Poliorcetes against Cassander, 302 BCE
The association of Greek states, also known as the Symmachy, under Antigonus III Doson originally formed to fight Cleomenes III of Sparta, 226 BCE
The association of Greek cities under Hadrian in 131 CE (See Panhellenion)

Other uses
Hellenic Football League, English football league